Gun Metal Grey is a 2010 Hong Kong police procedural television serial drama starring Felix Wong and Michael Miu. Produced by Terry Tong and edited by Lau Choi-wan and Leung Yan-tung, Gun Metal Grey is a TVB production.

List of episodes

Viewership ratings
The following is a list of rating points based on television viewership. "HK viewers in millions" refers to the number of people, derived from the average rating, in Hong Kong who watched the episode live.

See also
Gun Metal Grey
List of Gun Metal Grey characters

References

Gun Metal Grey